Umbozero Lake (named after the adherent Umba River) is located in Murmansk Oblast of Russia, between the Khibiny on the west and Lovozero Tundras on the east. Area is 422 km², average depth is 15 m, maximum is 115. The lake freezes from the end of October. Its largest island is Sarvanovsky. Three kinds of fish are found in the lake.

Umbozero
Umba basin